Anindya Ghose (born c. 1974) is an Indian-born American academic, and the Heinz Riehl Chair Professor of Business at New York University's Stern School of Business and the Director of the Masters of Business Analytics program at NYU Stern.  He has been a Visiting Professor at the Wharton School of Business. He is the author of TAP: Unlocking The Mobile Economy which is a double winner in the 2018 Axiom Business Book Awards and has been translated into five languages (Korean, Mandarin, Vietnamese, Japanese and Taiwanese). He is a Leonard Stern Faculty Scholar with an MBA scholarship (the Ghose Scholarship) named after him. He has been a Visiting Professor at the Wharton School of Business. In 2014 he was named by the blog Poets and Quants as one of the "Top 40 Professors Under 40 Worldwide" and by Analytics Week as one of the "Top 200 Thought Leaders in Big Data and Business Analytics". In 2017 he was recognized by Thinkers50 as one of the Top 30 Management Thinkers globally most likely to shape the future of how organizations are managed and led in the next generation. Thinkers50 also bestowed the Distinguished Achievement Award Nomination for 'Digital Thinking' in 2017. In 2019, he was recognized by Web of Science citation Index in the top 1% of researchers selected for their significant influence in their fields over a 10-year period (2008-2018). He is a recipient of the prestigious INFORMS ISS Distinguished Fellow Award, given to recognize individuals who (i) have made outstanding intellectual contributions to the discipline with publications that have made a significant impact on theory, research, and practice and (ii) intellectual stewardship of the field as reflected in the mentoring of doctoral students and young researchers. His rise from assistant to full professor in 8.5 years at NYU Stern is widely regarded as one of the fastest in the history of the entire Information Systems, operations and Marketing academic disciplines in business schools globally.

In 2020, he was recognized by the INFORMS Information Systems Society (ISS) with the inaugural Practical Impacts Award. This award honors business school academics who have demonstrated outstanding leadership and sustained impact on the industry by deeply influencing practitioners, managers, executives, and policy makers using their academic research. In 2022, he became the youngest recipient of the Distinguished Alumni Award from IIM Calcutta in its 58 year history. He received the AIS Fellow Award in 2022. This award is given to scholars who have made significant global contributions to the discipline in terms of research, teaching and service. 

He has consulted in various capacities for Alibaba, Apple, Berkeley Corporation, CBS, Dataxu, DFS Group, Facebook, HR Ratings Mexico, Marico India, Microsoft, NBC Universal, OneVest, Samsung, Showtime, Snapchat, Verizon, Yahoo, 1-800-Contacts, and 3TI World, and collaborated with Adobe, Alibaba, China Mobile, Google, IBM, Indiegogo, Microsoft, Recobell, Telefonica, Travelocity, Via, and many other leading firms on realizing business value from IT investments, internet marketing, business analytics, mobile marketing, digital analytics, social media, and other areas. He serves as an Advisor to many start-ups in the US, India, Hong Kong, South Korea, Singapore, and China including Lucidity, Adrealm, Leverage Edu, Netcore, Co-FoundersLab, Ibus Networks, ZeroWeb, and EywaMedia amongst others.

He occasionally serves as an expert witness for information technology and consumer-related litigation and has provided expert testimony in multiple trials and depositions. He has experience in securities, intellectual property, antitrust and competition, trademark and copyright infringement, and merger appraisal cases. He has provided expert deposition or trial testimony in several high profile litigation matters, including the Tinder vs. Match valuation lawsuit, TD Bank vs. Stanford Ponzi Scheme, the Facebook IPO matter, the Verizon-AOL merger appraisal matter, the Federal Trade Commission's anti-trust case against 1-800-Contacts, the Snapchat patent violation case against Vaporstream, the counterfeit goods case against Amazon, the Yahoo privacy breach matter, and the interactive music streaming royalty rate case between Apple, Amazon, Google, Spotify, and the Copyright Royalty Board. He is affiliated as a Scientific Expert with Compass Lexecon. He has served as the Chief Data Scientist of 3TI World in China. 

He has been interviewed and his research has been profiled numerous times in the BBC, Bloomberg TV, CNBC, China Daily, The Economist, The Economic Times, Financial Times, Fox News, Forbes, The Guardian, Knowledge@Wharton, Korean Broadcasting News Company, Los Angeles Times, Marketplace Radio, MSNBC, National Public Radio, NBC, Newsweek, New York Times, New York Daily, NHK Japan Broadcasting, Quartz, Reuters, Time Magazine, Washington Post, Wall Street Journal, Xinhua, and elsewhere. He teaches courses on social media, digital marketing, business analytics and IT strategy at the undergraduate, MBA, EMBA, MSBA, and Executive Education level in various parts of the world including the US, India, China, South Korea, Taiwan, and Europe

Life and work 
Ghose received a B.Tech in Instrumentation and Control Engineering in 1996 from NIT Jalandhar in India, an MBA in 1998 from the Indian Institute of Management Calcutta (IIMC), and a MS in 2002 and a PhD in Management Sciences in 2004 from Carnegie Mellon University.

He has published more than 100 papers in premier scientific journals and peer reviewed conferences, and has given more than 300 talks internationally. He is a frequent keynote speaker in executive gatherings and thought leading events globally. His research has received 27 best paper awards and nominations. He is a winner of the NSF CAREER award and has been awarded 16 grants from Adobe, Google, Microsoft and several other corporations.

His research analyzes the economic consequences of the Internet on industries and markets transformed by its shared technology infrastructure. He has worked on product reviews, reputation and rating systems, digital marketing, sponsored search advertising, wearable technologies, mobile commerce, mobile advertising, crowdfunding, and online markets. He also plays a senior advisory role to several start-ups in the Internet space. He has been interviewed and his research has been profiled numerous times in the BBC, Bloomberg TV, New York Times, Financial Times, Forbes, NBC, Xinhua, Time, LA Times, Reuters, Washington Post, New York Daily, National Public Radio, Wall Street Journal, MSNBC, CNBC, China Daily, Knowledge@Wharton, and elsewhere.

He teaches for the Master of Science in Business Analytics Program for Executives (MSBA), which is jointly hosted by NYU Stern and NYU Shanghai and in the UG, MBA, TRIUM and EMBA programs.

Ghose's research interests are in the field of analyzing the "economic consequences of the Internet on industries and markets transformed by its shared technology infrastructure." His work primarily discusses the machinations and effects of Internet and electronic systems on social economic impact. Subtopics of this research include: crowdfunding, search engine advertisement monetization, mobile commerce, and commerce in social media.

Publications
Ghose is the co-author of over thirty publications and working papers. A selection:

References

External links
Anindya Ghose Personal Website
Stern Faculty and Research

Year of birth missing (living people)
Living people
Information systems researchers
New York University faculty
Carnegie Mellon University alumni